Georges Carrier (4 September 1910 – 5 May 1993) was a French basketball player. He competed in the men's tournament at the 1936 Summer Olympics.

References

1910 births
1993 deaths
French men's basketball players
Olympic basketball players of France
Basketball players at the 1936 Summer Olympics
Basketball players from Paris